Rex Dallas (born November 1938) is an Australian country musician, singer, songwriter, yodeller and bush balladeer. His albums also include selections of horse songs, war songs, mother songs and even one on the theme of coalmining.

Early life
Dallas was born in Wallerawang, a small mining town near Lithgow NSW. Dallas inherited a love of bush poetry through a close friendship with his grandfather, who regularly read poems to him.

Career
Dallas first appeared on local radio 2LT Lithgow, at the age of 15. One year later, he relocated to Sydney. He later toured with Lee Gordon and made his first single 'Bicycle Wreck' for EMI Records in 1960. From the early 1970s, Dallas toured extensively, accompanied by his band, the Dallas Cowboys. In 1981, Dallas featured in a television documentary about his touring show. When not touring with his country show, he regularly entertained at his own venue, Gully Park, in Moonbi, northern NSW.

Personal life
Rex married Adrienne Francis James in 1961. They have four sons - Brett, Colin, Jeffrey and Shannan. In 1989, Dallas purchased “Gully Park” property in Moonbi, near Tamworth NSW. In 2010, they sold "Gully Park" and bought a residence in Manilla NSW.
His granddaughter is Ashleigh Dallas.

Discography

Albums
{| class="wikitable plainrowheaders" style="text-align:center;" border="1"
|+ List of albums
! scope="col" style="width:20em;" | Title
! scope="col" style="width:20em;" | Details
|-
! scope="row" | The Harry Torrani Yodelling Album 
|
 Released: 1975
 Label: Hadley Records (HLP 1223) 
 Format: LP, Cassette
|-
! scope="row" | The Harry Torrani Yodelling Album Vol.2 
|
 Released: 1975
 Label: Hadley Records (HLP 1224) 
 Format: LP, Cassette
|-
! scope="row" | In the Days When I Was Me 
|
 Released: 1976
 Label: Hadley Records (HLP 1226) 
 Format: LP, Cassette
|-
! scope="row" | I Love the Old Bush Ballad Songs
|
 Released: 1977
 Label: Hadley Records (HLP 1234) 
 Format: LP, Cassette
|-
! scope="row" | Old Wallerawang
|
 Released: 1978
 Label: Hadley Records (HLP 1239) 
 Format: LP, Cassette
|-
! scope="row" | Here's to the Song Writer
|
 Released: 1979
 Label: Hadley Records (HLP 1244) 
 Format: LP, Cassette
|-
! scope="row" | Yodelling Mad
|
 Released: 1979
 Label: Hadley Records (HLP 1255) 
 Format: LP, Cassette
|-
! scope="row" | Buckjump and Saddle Tales
|
 Released: 1981
 Label: Hadley Records (HLP 1262) 
 Format: LP, Cassette
|-
! scope="row" | Remembering Those Hillbilly Hits
|
 Released: 1982
 Label: Hadley Records (HLP 1267) 
 Format: LP, Cassette
|-
! scope="row" | Mothers Flower Garden
|
 Released: 1982
 Label: Hadley Records (HLP 1275) 
 Format: LP, Cassette
|-
! scope="row" | Easy Lovin'''
|
 Released: 1984
 Label: Hadley Records (HLP 1280) 
 Format: LP, Cassette
|-
! scope="row" | Born to the Saddle|
 Released: 1984
 Label: Hadley Records (HLP 1284) 
 Format: LP, Cassette
|-
! scope="row" | For Valour|
 Released: 1985
 Label: Hadley Records (HLP 1288) 
 Format: LP, Cassette
|-
! scope="row" | Duelling Yodellers (with Owen Blundell)
|
 Released: 1988
 Label: Briar Records (BLP 2) 
 Format: LP, Cassette
|-
! scope="row" | We Dig Coal|
 Released: 1990
 Label: Sundown Records (SUN 0420) 
 Format: LP, Cassette, CD
|-
! scope="row" | Heart Lands|
 Released: 1994
 Label: Hadley Records (HCDM 1310) 
 Format: CD
|-
! scope="row" | Songs of My Country|
 Released: 1995
 Label: LBS Records (LBS022CD) 
 Format: CD
|-
! scope="row" | 24 Harry Torrani|
 Released: 1996
 Label: Hadley Records (HCDM 1314) 
 Format: CD
|-	
! scope="row" | Show Boat Kalang|
 Released: 2018
 Label: William Osland Consulting (7652935) 
 Format: CD
|}

Awards
Australian Roll of Renown
The Australian Roll of Renown honours Australian and New Zealander musicians who have shaped the music industry by making a significant and lasting contribution to Country Music. It was inaugurated in 1976 and the inductee is announced at the Country Music Awards of Australia in Tamworth in January.

|-
| 2000
| Rex Dallas
| Australian Roll of Renown
| 

Country Music Awards of Australia
The Country Music Awards of Australia (CMAA) (also known as the Golden Guitar Awards) is an annual awards night held in January during the Tamworth Country Music Festival, celebrating recording excellence in the Australian country music industry. They have been held annually since 1973.
 (wins only)
|-
| 1975
| Old Wallerawang''
| EP of the Year
| 
|-
| 1976
| "My Lancashire Yodelling Lass"
| Male Vocalist of the Year
| 
|-
| 1977
| himself
| Hands of Fame
| 
|-
| 1982
| "His Spurs Are Rusty Now" (with Colin Dallas)
| APRA Song of the Year
| 
|-
| 1992
| "The Western Main"
| Heritage Award
|

Tamworth Songwriters Awards
The Tamworth Songwriters Association (TSA) is an annual songwriting contest for original country songs, awarded in January at the Tamworth Country Music Festival. They commenced in 1986.
 (wins only)
|-
| 2001
| Rex Dallas
| Songmaker Award
| 
|-

References

Living people
1938 births
Australian singer-songwriters